The Tata Pixel was a concept rear-engined four-passenger city car, unveiled on 1 March 2011 by Tata Motors at the 81st International Motor Show in Geneva. Aimed primarily at the European market, it was primarily based on the Tata Nano platform.

History
The Tata Pixel is based upon the Nano Europa concept which was first shown at the 2009 Geneva Motor Show. Complying to the Europa concept, Nano was upgraded to meet EU safety and emission standards. The concept had undergone a series of improvements over the standard Nano, including an extended wheelbase, a new 3-cylinder engine, power steering, an anti-lock braking system (ABS), an improved interior and exterior and it was also heavier than the standard Nano.

Features
The Tata Pixel concept includes the following features

Zero Turn Drive
The Tata Pixel is able to maneuver and can be parked in tight spaces due to the zero turn toroidal traction-drive, Infinitely Variable Transmission (IVT), and due to its steering system design. This results in a turning circle radius of 2.6 meters. The steering and the transmission work together so that each wheel is driven independently with inputs from the steering system. By applying reverse drive on a single rear wheel and forward drive on a single front wheel, the car is able to turn almost in its own length.

Low Carbon Footprint and High Fuel Efficiency
The Tata Pixel features a start stop hybrid and regenerative braking system, with a fuel efficient and low emission diesel engine. It has  emissions of 89 gm/km and combined cycle fuel economy of 1 litre/100 km.

Design
The Tata Pixel features a monographic roof, silver shaped window graphic and forward sweeping roof line. It also features 2 scissor doors for easy access and visibility.

My Tata Connect
"My Tata Connect" is a platform which provides integration of smart phones or tablet with the vehicle's information, and entertainment system and also allows the user to control the key functions of the car.

Technical specifications
The Pixel is a  car with a three-cylinder 1200 cc rear engine.

See also 
 City car
 A-segment
 Tata Nano
 Mobius Motors

External links
 three websites are expired or invalid Tata Pixel. Unveiled on 1 March 2011 by Tata Motors at the 81st International Geneva Motor Show.
 Tata Megapixel. Newer version, unveiled on 6 March 2012 by Tata Motors at the 82nd International Geneva Motor Show.
 Tata Pixel – Official product page

References

2000s cars
City cars
Hatchbacks
Rear-wheel-drive vehicles
Rear-engined vehicles
Pixel
Cars introduced in 2011